Major General George Frederick Hopkinson OBE MC (14 December 1895 – 9 September 1943) was a senior British Army officer who commanded the 1st Airborne Division during World War II, where he was killed in action in Italy in September 1943. In addition to being one of the few British Army generals killed in action during the war, he was also the only British airborne general to be killed during the conflict.

Early life and First World War
Prior to the start of the First World War, Hopkinson worked as an apprentice at an engineering works at Retford, Nottinghamshire, his birthplace. Too young to join up when the conflict began, he enlisted in the British Army in early 1915, joining the Officers Training Corps and then being commissioned as a second lieutenant into the 4th Battalion, North Staffordshire Regiment as a second lieutenant (on probation) on 27 March 1915. After a short period on Guernsey with them, Hopkinson was posted to France as a signal officer in the 72nd Brigade, 36th (Ulster) Division. On 16 September 1918 he was awarded the Military Cross for his actions during the retreat of the British Army in 1918; the citation read:

The war came to an end soon after, due to the Armistice of 11 November 1918.

Between the wars
Hopkinson left the army shortly after the end of the conflict, and in 1919 enrolled in Caius College, Cambridge, where he studied for a civil engineering degree. When he had finished his studies, he spent some time travelling throughout Europe, visiting Poland, the Baltic States and Russia.

However, after this period of travelling, in 1923 he returned to the army and the North Staffordshire Regiment, and by the following year had reached the rank of captain. He began studying for entry into the Staff College, Camberley, and attained a place in the institution in January 1930. When he passed out of the Staff College he was seconded from his regiment and appointed as a General Staff Officer (GSO III) to the War Office, and was promoted a short time later to GSO II at the School of Artillery at Larkhill; during the period, he also learnt to fly, gaining his pilot's license in 1933. In 1936 he returned to his regiment and commanded a rifle company as a brevet major, but in 1937 he once again retired from the army, taking a job in a civil engineering firm that had operations in Turkey.

Second World War
When the Second World War began in September 1939, Hopkinson immediately rejoined the army and was posted to the Staff of the Military Representative that served on the Supreme War Council. In November 1939 he took command of a General Headquarters (GHQ) Reconnaissance Unit which served throughout the Battle of France; injured during a motorcycle accident, he recovered in time to evacuate himself and many of his unit's vehicles from Dunkirk. He was appointed Officer of the Order of the British Empire (OBE) on 20 August 1940 for his work during the Battle of France, in particular as liaison officer to Belgian forces. He then qualified as a parachutist and was then assigned to the British Army's airborne forces; as he trained he helped to pioneer a number of airborne tactics, including the delivery and casting off of gliders from the transport aircraft towing them. In late October 1941 Hopkinson was promoted to acting brigadier and took command of the 31st Independent Infantry Brigade, which was soon converted into the 1st Airlanding Brigade, which became part of the 1st Airborne Division, then commanded by Major General Frederick Browning.

On 6 April 1943 Hopkinson was promoted to the acting rank of major general, and succeeded Browning in command of the 1st Airborne Division. After being informed that Operation Husky, the Allied invasion of Sicily, would take place in several months, Hopkinson was determined that the 1st Airborne would participate, and thus implemented a tough training regime to ensure that the division was sufficiently prepared.

Sicily and Italy
Operation Husky began on the night of 9 July with an airborne assault by the 1st Airlanding Brigade (now commanded by Brigadier Philip Hicks) and the 1st Parachute Brigade of the 1st Airborne Division, and elements of the U.S. 82nd Airborne Division, with both divisions suffering heavy losses in men and equipment as they carried out their objectives. Due to a number of factors, including poor navigation and the inexperience of the pilots of the transport aircraft, many of the gliders transporting the 1st Airlanding Brigade failed to reach their assigned landing zones. One such glider carried Hopkinson and members of his staff; the tow-rope of the glider was detached prematurely and it was forced to ditch in the sea. Although uninjured, Hopkinson was forced to wait by the partially submerged glider until daylight, when he was picked up a Royal Navy destroyer. After both brigades had accomplished their missions, despite heavy casualties, they were withdrawn to North Africa to recover, and Allied ground forces began to fight through Sicily; fighting there ended on 17 August, and in early September the Allies launched their invasion of Italy itself.

On 8 September the 2nd and 4th Parachute Brigades landed in Italy, followed several days later by the remainder of the division landing at the port of Taranto. Hopkinson landed with the rest of the division and accepted the surrender of the Italian garrison there, then ordered the division to advance northwards. Fighting was fierce against Fallschirmjäger elements of the German 1st Parachute Division, which set up ambushes and roadblocks to deter the division; one such roadblock was set up near the town of Castellaneta. On 9 September, the 10th Parachute Battalion assaulted the roadblock, with Hopkinson in close attendance. During the fighting, Hopkinson was killed by machine gun fire. He was replaced by Brigadier Ernest Down, commander of the 2nd Parachute Brigade. Hopkinson was the only British airborne general to be killed during the Second World War. He is buried in Bari War Cemetery.

References

Bibliography

External links
Generals of World War II

1895 births
1943 deaths
Alumni of Gonville and Caius College, Cambridge
British Army generals of World War II
British Army personnel of World War I
British Army personnel killed in World War II
Graduates of the Staff College, Camberley
North Staffordshire Regiment officers
Officers of the Order of the British Empire
People from Retford
Recipients of the Military Cross
Deaths by firearm in Italy
Military personnel from Nottinghamshire
Allied invasion of Sicily
Burials in Apulia
British Army major generals